Claudia Julissa Cruz Rodríguez (born February 5, 1986, in Bonao) is a Dominican actress, TV Host, model and beauty pageant titleholder who represented her country at the Miss World 2004 pageant.

After representing Bonao and placing only as the fifth runner-up in the Miss Dominican Republic 2004 pageant, which was won by Larimar Fiallo, Cruz decided to take another chance at the new revamped and independent Miss Mundo Dominicana contest. For the first time ever the contest would be a reality show, the semifinalists being narrowed down by judges and the finalists and winners based on public vote. Having received 66% of the votes, Claudia was named winner on October 10, 2004, only a month before departure to the contest. Despite the lack of time to prepare herself for the Miss World pageant, she won the title of Continental Queen of the Caribbean and finished as the first runner-up to the eventual winner, María Julia Mantilla from Peru.

Cruz is the first Dominican beauty queen to have been elected by public vote. She is also the second-highest placed Dominican ever in the Miss World contest as she placed second, only Mariasela Álvarez has placed higher as she was the winner of Miss World 1982.

Cruz crowned her successor Elisa Abreu, on July 10, 2005.

Claudia has a sister, sports reporter Carolina Cruz de Martínez, who is married to the famous Dominican pitcher Pedro Martínez.

Claudia converted to Islam.

External links
 Claudia Cruz Official Website
 Trident Beauties Interview Claudia Cruz 
 Miss World

1986 births
Living people
People from Bonao
Miss Dominican Republic
Dominican Republic beauty pageant winners
Miss World 2004 delegates